Sphaeniscus lindbergi is a species of tephritid or fruit flies in the genus Sphaeniscus of the family Tephritidae.

Distribution
Cape Verde.

References

Tephritinae
Insects described in 1958
Diptera of Africa